Rapid Realty NYC was a rental-based real estate brokerage in New York City. It was the first rental brokerage in New York to utilize a business franchise model. After many legal battles and fines issued by the state of NY Rapid Realty is no longer in operation and Anthony Lolli has sold the company to get out from under the guise of Rapid Realty. , Rapid Realty had 65 offices. The company is based in Brooklyn. Anthony Lolli, the company's founder and CEO, started the company in 1998.

History
The company was founded as a real estate agency in 1998 by Anthony Lolli, when he opened the first Rapid Realty in Park Slope, Brooklyn. The company's first franchise opened in Bay Ridge, Brooklyn in 2009. The company has 65 locations with an office in Boston.

In 2012, Rapid Realty was named one of the city's best firms to work for by real estate newspaper, The Real Deal. The company was recognized with Inc. Magazine's 2012 Inc 5000 award. In 2013, it was awarded Franchisee Satisfaction Award by the Franchise Business Review.

In 2013, it was reported that Rapid Realty would give a pay increase to its brokers that get a tattoo of the company's logo. Also in 2013, Leopard Films began producing a reality television show that focuses on the brokerage.

References

Real estate services companies of the United States
Real estate companies established in 2009
Companies based in Brooklyn
2009 establishments in New York City